The Parc régional de la Rivière-Gentilly is a regional park Quebec for recreational and sports activities. It is located on the banks of the Gentilly River at Sainte-Marie-de-Blandford and Bécancour, in Bécancour Regional County Municipality, in administrative region of Centre-du-Québec, in Quebec, in Canada.

Activities 
This recreational tourism park offers a range of activities such as hiking, mountain biking and snowshoeing, as well as chalet camping. It also offers Sainte-Gertrude (sector of Bécancour) an equestrian campsite and trails for equestrian trails.

Administration 
This regional park is administered by the "Association for the Development of the Gentilly River Inc.", a non-profit organization established on June 3, 1992 under the Quebec Companies Act (part 3). This organization is managed by a board of directors.

History of the parc 
Omer Thibodeau is the son of Alphonse Thibodeau who had bought and operated a sawmill.

See also 
Gentilly River

Notes and references

External links 
 

Regional Parks of Quebec
Protected areas of Centre-du-Québec
Bécancour Regional County Municipality
Protected areas established in 1992